The Italian Riviera Championships also known as the San Remo International  was a combined men's and women's clay court tennis tournament founded in 1903 at San Remo, Liguria, Northern Italy. The tournament was staged at the Tennis Club Sanremo  (f.1897) until 1964, and was part of the Italian Riviera circuit of tennis tournaments.

History
The Italian Riviera Championships (San Remo)  were established in 1903. The championships were on regularly occasions the opening event at the start of the Italian clay court season. From 1956 until 1962 it was staged only twice. In 1964 the tournament was discontinued due to funding issues.

Fomer winners of the men's singles included; Major Ritchie (1903), Anthony Wilding (1908, 1912), Erik Worm (1927, 1930),  Jean Lesueur  (1931, 1933–1934), Gottfried von Cramm (1940), Dick Savitt (1951) Jaroslav Drobný, (1955), and Nicola Pietrangeli (1960, 1963). The women's single was previously won by Dorothy Holman (1925), Elizabeth Ryan (1924, 1928), Lucia Valerio (1929, 1932),  Pauline Betz  (1947), Doris Hart (1951) Shirley Bloomer (1955), and Almut Sturm (1964).

Venue
The Italian Riviera Championships was held at the Tennis and Bridge Club San Remo, (f.1897) today known as Tennis Sanremo.

Finals

Men's singles
(incomplete roll)

Women's singles
(incomplete roll)

References

Clay court tennis tournaments
Defunct tennis tournaments in Italy